Amara rectangula is a species of ground beetle in the family Carabidae, found in the United States and Mexico.

Subspecies
These two subspecies belong to the species Amara rectangula:
 Amara rectangula ciudadensis (Bates, 1891)
 Amara rectangula rectangula LeConte, 1855

References

Amara (genus)